High School Disco is the debut studio album by Australian singer Tim Campbell. The album is a covers album of classic hits from the 1960s, 1970s & 1980s. It was released by Universal Music Australia in April 2014. It peaked at number 25 on the ARIA Charts.

Upon release Campbell said "I feel as if this album was in my blood from about 8 years of age. I have lived through and loved this era of music, and it continues to excite me today. Our high school discos were always a memorable night, with classic melodies and music that had my friends and I on the dance floor all night”.

A music video for "Play That Funky Music" was released on 8 April 2014.
Campbell toured the album across Australia throughout June and July 2014.

Track listing

Tour
Campbell toured the album with 9 dates across Australia.

 June 12 : Adelaide (Festival Theatre)
 June 13 : Adelaide (Festival Theatre)
 June 20 : Bankstown (Bankstown Sports Club)
 June 21 : Canberra (Southern Cross Club)
 June 27 : Launceston (Country Club)
 June 28 : Hobart (Wrest Point Showroom)
 July 11 : Brisbane (Kedron Wavell)
 July 12 : Tweed Heads (Twin Towns)
 July 26 : Melbourne (Palms At Crown)

Charts

Release history

References

2014 debut albums
Universal Music Australia albums
Covers albums